A Prelate of Honour of His Holiness is a Catholic prelate to whom the Pope has granted this title of honour.

They are addressed as Monsignor and have certain privileges as regards clerical clothing.

Overview
Before the motu proprio Pontificalis Domus of 28 March 1968, Honorary Prelates (HP) were called Domestic Prelates. Those who held certain offices were also granted the title, such as an Archbishop or Bishop Assistant at the Pontifical Throne or a member of the Roman Prelature. The title was retained by archbishops, bishops and protonotaries apostolic who had been awarded it before their appointment to those positions.

The Prelates of Honor are entitled Reverendo Monsignore (Italian) or Reverendus Monsignor (Latin) (English: Reverend Monsignor).

Prelates of Honor:
 The Auditors of the Sacred Roman Rota
 The Clerics of the Apostolic Chamber

Prelates of Honor durante munere:
 The Canons of the cathedrals of Pisa, Siena and Vercelli
 The Canons of the Metropolitan Chapter of Genoa
 The Canons of the Metropolitan Chapter of Taranto
 The Canons of the Metropolitan Chapter of Bologna
 The Dignities of the Metropolitan Chapter of Catania
 The Senior of the Canons of San Lorenzo in Damaso in Rome
 The Conventual Chaplains ad honorem SMOM
 The Chaplains of the Royal Chapel of the Treasure of San Gennaro in Naples
 The Judges of the Tribunal of the Rota of the Apostolic Nunciature in Spain
 The Superior and Dean of the Collegiate Church of Prabuty (Poland)
 The Provost of Canzo (Archdiocese of Milan), 5 years after taking office
 The Provost of Asso (Archdiocese of Milan)
 The Parish Pastors of the Diocese of Rome
 The Provost pro tempore of Clusone (Bergamo)
 The Members of the Colleges of the Tribunal of the Apostolic Penitentiary, retaining their proper habit, or the Minor Apostolic Penitentiaries
 The pro tempore parish priest of Caravaggio (Bergamo).

See also
Chaplain of His Holiness
Protonotary apostolic

References

Catholic ecclesiastical titles
Honorary titles of the Holy See
Papal household